Shaping Up is an American sitcom created by writer-producers Sam Simon and Ken Estin, which ran for five weeks on ABC from March 20 until April 17, 1984.

Synopsis
A spring replacement in 1984, Shaping Up, originally titled Welcome to the Club, was given the 9:00 Tuesday slot following Three's Company.  Leslie Nielsen played Buddy Fox, curmudgeonly owner of the Buddy Fox Health Club. Michael Fontaine played Ben, the club's manager who was like a son to Buddy and served as the show's voice of sanity.  Other cast members included Jennifer Tilly, Shawn Weatherly and Jake Steinfeld of Body by Jake fame.

Five episodes were broadcast.  The role of Ben was first played by Tim Robbins, whom the network replaced with Fontaine.

Cast
Leslie Nielsen as Buddy Fox
 Cathie Shirriff as Zoya Antonova
Michael Fontaine as Ben
Jennifer Tilly as Shannon Winters
Shawn Weatherly as Melissa McDonald

US television ratings

Episodes

References

External links
 

1984 American television series debuts
1984 American television series endings
1980s American sitcoms
American Broadcasting Company original programming
English-language television shows
Television series by CBS Studios
Television shows set in Los Angeles